John Llewellyn (born 4 January 1954) is a British former auto racing driver. He competed regularly in the British Touring Car Championship and the Willhire 24 Hour endurance race. His last BTCC appearance came in 1991 for Tech-Speed Motorsport. 
Since retiring from racing he has been involved in running corporate-hospitality companies.

Racing record

Complete British Touring Car Championship results
(key) (Races in bold indicate pole position in class) (Races in italics indicate fastest lap in class - 1 point awarded all races)

‡ Endurance driver.

References

Living people
British Touring Car Championship drivers
Year of birth missing (living people)
Britcar 24-hour drivers